Roberto Guajardo Suárez (16 October 1918 – c. October 2008) was a Mexican lawyer who served as the second director-general of the Monterrey Institute of Technology (ITESM, 1947–1951), as a founding president of Sociedad Artística Tecnológico (the Institute's artistic society) in 1948 and as president of Coparmex, a Mexican employers' association (1960–1973).

Guajardo Suárez was born in Monterrey, Nuevo León, into a family composed by Manuel Guajardo Medina and Sofía Suárez. He received a bachelor's degree in Law from the Escuela Libre de Derecho (1941) and served as director of Sulfato de Viesca, S.A.  (1951–53) and Refrescos Internacionales (1953–60).

References

20th-century Mexican lawyers
Escuela Libre de Derecho alumni
Academic staff of the Monterrey Institute of Technology and Higher Education
Businesspeople from Monterrey
1918 births
2008 deaths